Cerebellar degeneration-related protein 2 is a protein that in humans is encoded by the CDR2 gene.

See also
 Cerebellar degeneration-related protein 1

References

Further reading

External links